Christopher Bobonich (born February 8, 1960) is an American philosopher and a leading scholar of Ancient Greek philosophy, especially known for his work on Plato's Laws.  He is currently Clarence Irving Lewis Professor of Philosophy and Professor of Classics (by courtesy) at Stanford University.

Education and career

Bobonich was born on February 8, 1960, in Southeastern Pennsylvania. He completed his BA in Government at Harvard University in 1981. He then went on to complete his MPhil (1983) in Philosophy at Cambridge University and his PhD in Philosophy at UC Berkeley (1990) under Alan Code, now his colleague at Stanford.  He taught first at the University of Chicago, and, since 1996, at Stanford University.

See also
American philosophy
List of American philosophers

Bibliography
Plato's Laws: A Critical Guide (ed), (Cambridge Critical Guides), Cambridge University Press, 2010
Akrasia in Greek Philosophy: From Socrates to Plotinus (ed), (with P. Destrée), Brill Publishers, 2007
Plato's Utopia Recast: His Later Ethics and Politics, Oxford University Press, 2002

References

Page at Stanford.edu

1964 births
20th-century American essayists
20th-century American philosophers
21st-century American essayists
21st-century American non-fiction writers
21st-century American philosophers
Alumni of the University of Cambridge
American ethicists
American male essayists
Analytic philosophers
Epistemologists
Harvard College alumni
Historians of philosophy
Living people
Metaphysicians
Ontologists
Philosophers of history
Philosophers of law
Philosophers of literature
Philosophy academics
Philosophy writers
Political philosophers
Social philosophers
Stanford University Department of Philosophy faculty
UC Berkeley College of Letters and Science alumni
20th-century American male writers
21st-century American male writers